The 2016 Filoil Flying V Preseason Premier Cup is the eleventh preseason high school and collegiate basketball tournament organized by Filoil Flying V Sports. The opening ceremonies was held on April 30, 2016 at the Filoil Flying V Centre in San Juan. 

Former UAAP champions De La Salle Green Archers and former NCAA champions Arellano University Chiefs will head-to-head in the seniors division finals. At the end, the Green Archers won the championship over the Chiefs, 86-74.

This will be their final television broadcast year with ABS-CBN Sports and Action after 10 years, the television broadcast will eventually returned to ESPN 5 beginning with the 2018 edition of the cup.

Teams

Senior's

Junior's

Seniors' tournament

Elimination round

Group A

Team standings

Schedule

Results

Number of asterisks (*) denotes the number of overtime periods.

Group B

Team Standings

Schedule

Results

Number of asterisks (*) denotes the number of overtime periods.

Playoffs

Bracket

Semi-finals

Battle-for-Third

Final

Juniors' tournament

Elimination round

Group A

Group B

Playoffs

Bracket

Semi-finals

Battle-for-Third

Final

Final standings
Juniors

Seniors

Individual awards
Juniors

Most Valuable Player: Samuel Abuhijle ( San Beda)
Mythical Five:
Samuel Abuhijle ( San Beda)
Evan Agbong ( Adamson)
Kenji Roman ( FEU)
John Lloyd Clemente ( NU)
Rhayyan Amsali ( NU)
Best Defensive Player: Kenji Roman ( FEU)

Seniors
Most Valuable Player: Ben Mbala ( La Salle)
Mythical Five:
Ben Mbala ( La Salle)
Jeron Teng ( La Salle)
Michael Salado ( Arellano)
Abu Tratter ( La Salle)
Jio Jalalon ( Arellano)
Best Defensive Player: Ben Mbala ( La Salle)

References

2016 in Philippine sport
Filoil Flying V Preseason Premier Cup